Interstate 15 Business (BL 15) is a business loop of Interstate 15 (I-15) in Cascade County, Montana, United States, almost entirely within Great Falls. The route links I-15 (which bypasses downtown Great Falls to the west) with the center of Great Falls. As its business loop designation implies, BL 15 terminates at I-15 (running concurrently with U.S. Route 89 [US 89] and Montana Highway 200 [MT 200] through western Great Falls) at each end. The southernmost  of the route from the interchange with I-15 to Fox Farm Road is designated, but not signed, as Interstate 315 (I-315). I-315 is the second shortest Interstate in the country; only the unsigned I-878 is shorter.

Route description

BL 15 begins at I-15 exit 278 in an unincorporated area of Cascade County, a short distance southwest of Great Falls. At the trumpet interchange, US 89 and MT 200 separate from I-15 and merge with BL 15. Additionally, MT 3 begins at the interchange and follows the three routes to the east. Just east of the interchange with I-15, BL 15 intersects 14th Street. The Interstate Highway–standard conditions come to an end a short distance to the east at an intersection with Fox Farm Road. Here, the  I-315 (designated along BL 15 from I-15 to Fox Farm Road) comes to an end while BL 15, US 89, MT 3, and MT 200 continue across the Missouri River into downtown Great Falls.

Within downtown, the four routes remain concurrent along 10th Avenue South to the parallel one-way couplet of 5th and 6th streets. BL 15 northbound separates from US 89/MT 3/MT 200 at 6th Street, following the street northward through the city to the one-way 2nd Avenue North near the city center. BL 15 turns to the west, following 2nd to Park Street, then Park south to Central Avenue, where BL 15 northbound rejoins the routing of BL 15 southbound. Between Central Avenue and 10th Avenue South, BL 15 southbound is routed along 1st Avenue North east to 5th Street South, then 5th South to 10th Avenue.

BL 15 follows Central Avenue to the west, crossing the Missouri River once more as it exits downtown. After several intersections with local streets, BL 15 terminates at I-15 exit 280. Central Avenue, however, continues westward from the exit.

Major intersections

See also

 Business routes of Interstate 15 in Montana

References

External links

15 Business (Great Falls, Montana)
15 Business (Great Falls)
Business (Great Falls, Montana)
Transportation in Cascade County, Montana